{{Infobox film
| name = The Double Life of Mr. Alfred Burton
| image =
| image_size =
| caption =
| director = Arthur Rooke
| producer =George Clarke
| based_on       = The Double Life of Mr. Alfred Burton by E. Phillips Oppenheim
| writer =  Kenelm Foss
| narrator =
| starring =Kenelm Foss  Ivy Duke  James Lindsay (actor)
| music =
| cinematography =
| editing = 
| studio =Lucky Cat Productions
| distributor = Ideal Films
| released = July 1919
| runtime = 
| country = United States
| language = Silent  English intertitles
| budget =
| gross =
}}The Double Life of Mr. Alfred Burton is a 1919 British silent comedy film directed by Arthur Rooke and starring Kenelm Foss, Ivy Duke and James Lindsay. It was based on the 1913 novel The Double Life of Mr. Alfred Burton'' by Edward Phillips Oppenheim.

Cast
 Kenelm Foss as Alfred Burton 
 Ivy Duke as Edith Cowper 
 Elaine Madison as Mrs. Burton 
 Joe Peterman as Mr. Waddington 
 James Lindsay as Mr.Bomford 
 Philip Hewland as Lord Idlemay 
 Humberston Wright as Kamar Shri 
 Ronald Power as Cowper 
 Gordon Craig as Alfie Burton

References

External links

1919 films
1919 comedy films
British silent feature films
British comedy films
Films directed by Arthur Rooke
Films based on British novels
British black-and-white films
1910s English-language films
1910s British films
Silent comedy films